The 2017 Challenger Banque Nationale de Drummondville was a professional tennis tournament played on indoor hard courts. It was the 11th edition of the tournament and part of the 2017 ATP Challenger Tour, offering a total of $75,000 in prize money. It took place in Drummondville, Canada between March 14 and March 19, 2017.

Singles main-draw entrants

Seeds

1 Rankings are as of March 6, 2017

Other entrants
The following players received wildcards into the singles main draw:
  Félix Auger-Aliassime
  Philip Bester
  Filip Peliwo
  Brayden Schnur

The following players received entry as alternates:
  Grégoire Barrère
  Daniel Nguyen
  Peter Polansky
  Eduardo Struvay

The following players received entry from the qualifying draw:
  Matthias Bachinger
  Adrien Bossel
  Liam Broady
  Tim Pütz

Champions

Singles

 Denis Shapovalov def.  Ruben Bemelmans, 6–3, 6–2

Doubles

 Sam Groth /  Adil Shamasdin def.  Matt Reid /  John-Patrick Smith, 6–3, 2–6, [10–8]

External links
Official website

Challenger Banque Nationale de Drummondville
Challenger de Drummondville
Challenger Banque Nationale de Drummondville